Paul B. Johnson State Park is a public recreation area on the shores of Geiger Lake, located off U.S. Highway 49 in McLaurin, Mississippi, approximately  south of Hattiesburg. The state park is named after Paul B. Johnson, the forty-sixth governor of Mississippi.

Description
The park is situated on rolling hills that contain flowering dogwoods, southern yellow pines, and oaks.  Geiger Lake, once known as Lake Shelby, was constructed during the mid-1940s using German prisoner of war labor by POWs housed at Camp Shelby.

Activities and amenities
The 225-acre (91-ha) lake offers fishing, water skiing, and swimming. The lake is stocked with largemouth bass, bluegill, shellcracker, crappie, and channel catfish. The park features 25 primitive tent-camping areas, 125 RV camping pads with water, sewer and electrical hookups, and 16 vacation cabins. The park also offers 50 picnic sites with grills, six picnic pavilions, playground equipment, and a splash pad.

References

External links

Paul B. Johnson State Park Mississippi Department of Wildlife, Fisheries, and Parks
Paul B. Johnson State Park Map Mississippi Department of Wildlife, Fisheries, and Parks

State parks of Mississippi
Protected areas of Forrest County, Mississippi